Singrauli Super Thermal Power Plant is located at Shaktinagar in Sonebhadra district in Indian state of Uttar Pradesh. The power plant is the first power plant of NTPC. It sources coal from Jayant and Bina mines and water from Rihand Reservoir. The states benefitting from this power plant are Uttar Pradesh, Uttarakhand, Rajasthan, Punjab, Haryana and Himachal Pradesh and the Union Territories of Delhi, Chandigarh and Jammu and Kashmir. An investment worth  has already been cleared. It even gets international assistance from IDA.

ON 31 December 2014, a 15 MW solar PV was commissioned at NTPC SIngrauli. An 8 MW small hydro CW discharge plant has been constructed on discharge canal.

Capacity

Coal based 
The unit wise capacity and other details are as follows.

Renewable energy 

to the monitoring cast

References 

Coal-fired power stations in Uttar Pradesh
Buildings and structures in Sonbhadra district
Hydroelectric power stations in Uttar Pradesh
1986 establishments in Uttar Pradesh
Energy infrastructure completed in 1986